Giovanni Battista Falesi, O.P. (1587–1648) was a Roman Catholic prelate who served as Bishop of Mottola (1638–1648).

Biography
Giovanni Battista Falesi was born in Naples, Italy in 1587 and ordained a priest in the Order of Preachers.
On 15 January 1638, he was appointed during the papacy of Pope Urban VIII as Bishop of Mottola.
On 24 January 1638, he was consecrated bishop by Francesco Maria Brancaccio, Cardinal-Priest of Santi XII Apostoli, with Alfonso Gonzaga, Titular Archbishop of Rhodus, and Biago Proto de Rubeis, Archbishop of Messina, serving as co-consecrators. 
He served as Bishop of Mottola until his death in 1648.

References

External links and additional sources
 (for Chronology of Bishops)
 (for Chronology of Bishops)

17th-century Italian Roman Catholic bishops
Bishops appointed by Pope Urban VIII
1587 births
1648 deaths
Dominican bishops